Sébastien Vaillant (May 26, 1669 – May 20, 1722) was French botanist who was born at Vigny in present-day Val d'Oise.

Early years 
Vaillant went to school at the age of four and by the age of five, he was collecting plants and transplanting them into his father's garden. At the age of six, he was sent to a boarding school at Pontoise. He suffered with a fever for four months which he claims to have cured using lettuce seasoned with vinegar.

He was sent to study with the organist of the Pontoise Cathedral. When the organist died, Vaillant succeeded him at the age of eleven.

Vaillant studied medicine and surgery at the hospital in Pontoise (medicine then included studies in botany). He left Pontoise for Évreux at the age of nineteen. He was at the  battle of Fleurus in 1690 as a surgeon. While still a surgeon in 1691, he was in Paris when he took as his master of botany Joseph Pitton de Tournefort (1656–1708). Tournefort used Vaillant's talents while writing  (History of the plants that are born around Paris), published in 1698. Vaillant also took lessons in anatomy with Joseph-Guichard Du Verney and chemistry with Antoine de Saint-Yon.

Botanist 
Guy-Crescent Fagon, the king's physician and botanist, noticed Sébastien Vaillant and made him his secretary. Vaillant was therefore able to devote himself to the study of plants for which he obtained unlimited access to the Royal Garden. Fagon appointed him director. Fagon himself was a teacher and sub-demonstrator  at the Royal Garden.  

The garden collections grew considerably under the leadership of Vaillant. Even though Vaillant himself was based in Paris and is remembered for his work on the Parisian flora, the garden had several contributors outside Paris, in particular in the colonies.

Fagon obtained from  Louis XIV an authorization to build a "Cabinet of drugs" in the Royal Garden and charged Vaillant to furnish it and to provide security.

Charles Bouvard had the first greenhouse built: the Garden had plants from hot countries, and in 1714 Vaillant obtained the authorization to build another one.

He became ill and too poor to publish his  (alphabetically or Enumeration of plants that grow in and around Paris) illustrated by Claude Aubriet. A fruit of 36 years of work, he left his work at Herman Boerhaave's home, . The work contained engraved illustrations and was published in 1727. It is a work of particular importance in the history of botany and one of the first to describe the flora known. Vaillant introduced the terms of stamen, ovary, and egg in their current direction.

All his life, Vaillant opposed the theses of Joseph Pitton de Tournefort. As a mark of respect Carl von Linné named a genus Valantia after Vaillant in the Rubiaceae.

His herbarium is now kept at the National Museum of Natural History, France.

References

External links
 
 
 Vaillant, Sébastien (1727) Botanicon Parisiense, ou Denombrement par ordre alphabetique des plantes - digital facsimile from the Linda Hall Library

1669 births
1722 deaths
Botanists with author abbreviations
18th-century French botanists
French mycologists
Pre-Linnaean botanists
Members of the French Academy of Sciences
National Museum of Natural History (France) people
17th-century French botanists